The National Weather Service confirmed 270 tornadoes in the United States in June 2009.

United States yearly total

June

Note: 2 tornadoes were confirmed in the final totals, but do not have a listed rating.

June 1 event

June 2 event

June 3 event

June 4 event

June 5 event

June 6 event

June 7 event

June 8 event

June 9 event

June 10 event

June 11 event

June 12 event

June 13 event

June 14 event

June 15 event

June 16 event

June 17 event

June 18 event

June 19 event

June 20 event

June 21 event

June 22 event

June 23 event

June 24 event

June 26 event

June 27 event

June 28 event

June 30 event

See also
Tornadoes of 2009

References

Tornadoes of 2009
2009, 06
June 2009 events in the United States